Gilles Hilary is an accountant academic, working as a Professor of Accounting and Control at Georgetown University.

Background

Dr. Gilles Hilary is a French accounting academic and a Chaired Professor at Georgetown University.  He was educated in the US, obtaining an MBA from Cornell University and a Ph.D. from the University of Chicago.  He is also a professional French accountant, holding a DESCF qualification.  His work experience includes six years as a professor at INSEAD and seven years at the Hong Kong University of Science and Technology (HKUST) and prior to that, as an auditor for KPMG and Ernst & Young.

Research

Dr. Hilary's research focuses on the use of accounting information to make investing and financing decisions.  His work has been published in journals such as The Accounting Review, the Journal of Accounting and Economics, the Journal of Accounting Research, the Journal of Finance, the Journal of Financial Economic, Management Science or the Review of Accounting Studies.

Awards
 Franklin Prize for Teaching Excellence, (MBA Teaching), 2007
 Elected "Best Professor for Required Courses" by MBA students, 2007
 Franklin Prize for Teaching Excellence (Undergraduate Teaching), 2005
 Wei Lun Fellowship, HKUST, 2002–2004
 Oscar G. Mayer Foundation Fellowship, 2001–2002
 University of Chicago Fellowship, 1997–2001
 SSRN Top Ten download lists, 2001–2008
 Aoki Outstanding Paper Award, 2000

Publications  
 Volodymyr Babich and Gilles Hilary. "Distributed Ledgers and Operations." Manufacturing & Service Operations Management (M&SOM), Forthcoming (2018)
 Sterling Huang and Gilles Hilary. "Zombie Board: Board Tenure and Firm Performance." Journal of Accounting Research, 56, 4 (September 2018): 1285-1329. 
 The Bright Side of Managerial Over-optimism. Journal of Accounting and Economics 62.1 (2016): 46-64 (with Charles Hsu, Benjamin Segal and Rencheng Wang).
 Management Forecast Consistency, The Journal of Accounting Research, Vol. 52, Iss. 1, 2014, 163–191 (with Charles Hsu and Rencheng Wang).
 The Role of Analysts in Intra-Industry Information Transfer, The Accounting Review, July 2013, Vol. 88, No. 4, pp. 1265–1287. (with Rui Shen).
 Analyst Forecasts Consistency, The Journal of Finance, Vol. 68, Iss. 1, pp. 271–297, February 2013 (with Charles Hsu).
 The Role of Anchoring Bias in the Equity Market: Evidence from Analysts' Earnings Forecasts and Stock Returns. Journal of Financial and Quantitative Analysis, volume 48, issue 01, 2013, pp. 47–76 (with Ling Cen and KC John Wei).
 Endogenous Overconfidence in Managerial Forecasts. Journal of Accounting and Economics, Vol. 51, 2011, pp. 300–313 (with Charles Hsu).
 CEO Ability, Pay, and Firm Performance." Management Science, Vol. 56, Iss. 10, 2010, pp. 1633–1652 (with Yuk Ying Chang and Sudipto Dasgupta).
 How Does Financial Reporting Quality Relate to Investments Efficiency? - Journal of Accounting and Economics, Vol. 48, 2009, pp. 112–131 (with Gary Biddle and Rodrigo Verdi).
 The Effect of Auditor Quality on Financing Decisions. - The Accounting Review, Vol. 84, No. 4, 2009, pp. 1085–1117 (with Xin Chang and Sudipto Dasgupta).
 Does Religion Matter in Corporate Decision Making in America? - Journal of Financial Economics 93, 2009, 455-473 (with Kai Wai Hui).
 Accounting Quality and Firm-level Capital Investment. - The Accounting Review, Vol. 81, No. 5, 2006,  963-982 (with Gary Biddle)
 Organized Labor and Information Asymmetry in Financial Markets. - The Review of Accounting Studies, Vol. 11, Iss. 4.
 Does Past Success Lead Analysts to Become Overconfident? - Management Science, Vol. 52, No. 4, 489-500 (with Lior Menzly).
 Analyst Coverage and Financing Decisions. - Journal of Finance, Vol. 61, Iss 6, 3009-3048 (with Xin Chang and Sudipto Dasgupta).
 The Credibility of Self-Regulation: Evidence from the Accounting Profession's Peer Review Program. - Journal of Accounting and Economics 40, 211-229 (with Clive Lennox).

References

External links
 Georgetown University - McDonough School of Business - Department of Accounting

Living people
French accountants
Year of birth missing (living people)